Diaphanometopus is an extinct genus of trilobite in the order Phacopida. It is known from the Lower Ordovician of Russia (Oeland series, Pavlovsk).

References

External links
 Diaphanometopus at the Paleobiology Database
 photo of the pygidium of D. volborthi
 photo of the cephalon of ''D. volborthi

Dalmanitoidea
Phacopida genera
Ordovician trilobites
Fossils of Russia